Limbo, or Anti Submarine Mortar Mark 10 (A/S Mk.10), was the final development of the forward-throwing anti-submarine weapon Squid, designed during the Second World War and was developed by the Admiralty Underwater Weapons Establishment in the 1950s.

Limbo was installed on the quarterdeck of Royal Navy escort ships from 1955 to the mid-1980s, Australian–built  destroyer and s.

Operation
Limbo was loaded and fired automatically with the crew under-cover and was stabilised in pitch and roll. The weapon was linked to the sonar system of the ship, firing on command when the target was in range. The rounds were projected so that they fell in a triangular pattern around the target in any direction around the ship.

The weapon was used in the 1982 Falklands War and remained in service in the Royal Navy and Commonwealth navies until the 1990s. A surviving system is preserved at Explosion! Museum of Naval Firepower in Gosport, Hampshire.

Sonar control of the A/S Mortar Mk 10
The firing of the Mortar Mk 10 was controlled by the Type 170 (and later the 502) attack sonar from the Sonar Control Room (SCR), which was generally located next to the operations room in the warship.  The 170 sonar had three operators who maintained sonar contact with the target and aimed the weapon in bearing, range and depth.  Firing was done by means of a pistol grip and trigger mounted to the deckhead.

General characteristics
 Total system weight: 35 tons including 51 projectiles (17 salvos).

References

305 mm artillery
Anti-submarine mortars
Explosive weapons
Naval weapons of the Cold War
Naval weapons of the United Kingdom
Military equipment introduced in the 1950s